
Franz Schlieper (22 August 1905 – 4 April 1974) was a general in the Wehrmacht of Nazi Germany during World War II.  He was a recipient of the Knight's Cross of the Iron Cross.  Schlieper surrendered to the Soviet forces in May 1945 and was held in the Soviet Union as a war criminal until 1955.

Awards and decorations 
 German Cross in Gold on 10 January 1944 as Oberst in Grenadier-Regiment 94
 Knight's Cross of the Iron Cross on 21 September 1944 as Oberst and commander of Grenadier-Brigade 1132

References

Citations

Bibliography

 
 

1905 births
1974 deaths
Military personnel from Berlin
Major generals of the German Army (Wehrmacht)
Reichswehr personnel
Recipients of the Gold German Cross
Recipients of the Knight's Cross of the Iron Cross
German prisoners of war in World War II held by the Soviet Union
People from the Province of Brandenburg